Ilkka Suvanto (born 13 August 1943) is a Finnish former butterfly, freestyle and medley swimmer. He competed at the 1960 Summer Olympics and the 1964 Summer Olympics. Suvanto became a U.S. citizen in 1968.

References

External links
 

1943 births
Living people
Finnish male butterfly swimmers
Olympic swimmers of Finland
Swimmers at the 1960 Summer Olympics
Swimmers at the 1964 Summer Olympics
Swimmers from Helsinki
American people of Finnish descent
Finnish emigrants to the United States
Naturalized citizens of the United States
Finnish male freestyle swimmers
Finnish male medley swimmers